Alexis Marie Smith (born August 18, 1996) is an American softball coach and former player. She attended Temple High School in Temple, Texas. She later attended Temple College for two years, before transferring to Texas A&M University, where she pitched for the Texas A&M Aggies softball team. During her junior season in 2017, Smith led the Aggies to the 2017 Women's College World Series first round, where they fell to UCLA, 8–2. Smith was named the pitching coach at Northwestern State University on August 12, 2021.

Head coaching record

References

External links
 
Northwestern State bio
Texas A&M bio
Temple bio

1996 births
American softball players
Living people
Softball players from Texas
People from Temple, Texas
Texas A&M Aggies softball players
Texas A&M Aggies softball coaches
Northwestern State Lady Demons softball coaches
American softball coaches